Khirni is a gram panchayat in the Sawai Madhopur district of Rajasthan, India. It is located 32 km from the Sawai Madhopur town. It lies 6 km from the 4-lane Kota-Agra highway at Bhadoti. At present Mr  Roopsingh Gurjar is Sarpanch of Khirni gram panchayat.

Agriculture is the main occupation in Khirni. The town lies near the Banas river, and canals provide irrigation.

There are two Government senior secondary schools, one each for boys and girls. Other schools are:
 Govt.Upper Primary school Dhani Khirni 
 Aadarsh Vidya Mandir
 Senior Secondary Saraswati Vidya Mandir
Suman public school
Employment english medium school
 Shaeen Public School 
 Govt. Girls Senior Secondary School 
 Madarsa Zia-ul-Ulum (Arabic and Urdu). 

There are 10 temples and 6 mosques. There is a primary health center as well.5

References 

Villages in Sawai Madhopur district